Percy Brown (birth unknown – death unknown) was an English professional rugby league footballer who played in the 1920s. He played at representative level for Yorkshire, and at club level for Dewsbury, as a forward, particularly , i.e. number 9, during the era of contested scrums.

Background
Percy Brown was born in Normanton, West Riding of Yorkshire, England.

Playing career

County honours
Percy Brown won cap(s) for Yorkshire while at Dewsbury.

Challenge Cup Final appearances
Percy Brown played  in Dewsbury's 2–13 defeat by Wigan in the 1929 Challenge Cup Final during the 1928–29 season at Wembley Stadium, London on Saturday 4 May 1929, in front of a crowd of 41,000.

Contemporaneous article extract
"P. Brown' Dewsbury, (Northern Rugby League.) Percy Brown was born at Normanton, and can be regarded as a local discovery. He can play in any position forward, but he is usually in the front row, and is regarded as one of the finest "stickers" in Yorkshire. He has had county honours, and has been considered for International distinction. Brown is as prominent in the loose as in tight pack work and he is sure to claim further honours"

References

External links
Search for "Brown" at rugbyleagueproject.org

Dewsbury Rams players
English rugby league players
Place of death missing
Rugby league hookers
Rugby league players from Wakefield
Sportspeople from Normanton, West Yorkshire
Year of birth missing
Year of death missing
Yorkshire rugby league team players